Sare is a village and a commune in the Pyrénées-Atlantiques department in south-western France on the border with Spain. It is part of the traditional Basque province of Labourd.

Geography
The commune is backed by the Pyrenees mountain range, which forms a basin around the village open to the east and the north. Its geological history explains the formation of caves that were occupied by the Aurignacian. The Bronze Age left a number of funerary monuments on the slopes and mountain plateaus of the region.

The summit can be reached by the Petit train de la Rhune, which commences from the Col de Saint-Ignace,  to the west of the village on the D4 road to Saint-Jean-de-Luz.

History
Today, its territory forms an enclave in the Navarre, a region of Spain, with which it shares a  border. This in particular has had significant consequences on the history of the village, with centuries of pastoral agreements with neighbouring Spanish villages. During the Peninsular War the Anglo-Portuguese Army led by the future Duke of Wellington breached the frontier and repelled the French troops who had stationed themselves in forts on La Rhune.

The village contains many old buildings with around 283 houses identified by as dating partially as far back as the 15th century. The traditional architecture of these buildings, their exterior decorations and the orientation defines the archetype of the rural house that exists in the popular image of the "Basque House".

Demography
The population of Sare has remained stable for 200 years. Since 1793 the only real development that has occurred began in 1990, and the population reached more than 2500 people in the 2010s.

Economy
Agricultural activity remains a constant element of the town's economy, even though the location has hosted mining industries since the Middle Ages, and more recently a wool treatment mill. The proximity of the border with Spain, and the configuration of the terrain and the roadways, as well as the shared Basque languages, have given birth to a local economy shared between Spain and France, characterised by smuggling.

Tourist attractions
Following are the famous places to see in Sare, Basque:

 Le Train de la Rhune
 Les Grottes de Sare
 Le Musee du Gateau Basque
 Parc Animalier Etxola
 Ortillopitz
 Eglise Saint-Martin de Sare
 Office de Tourisme de Sare
 Basq'quad
 Bask Peche Nature
 Suhalmendi, Decouverte du Porc Basque

People
Alberto Palacio, Spanish engineer
Wentworth Webster, English collector of Basque folk tales
Victor Iturria, WWII decorated hero

See also
Communes of the Pyrénées-Atlantiques department
Devoucoux
End of Basque home rule in France
The works of Maxime Real del Sarte

References

Communes of Pyrénées-Atlantiques
Plus Beaux Villages de France
Pyrénées-Atlantiques communes articles needing translation from French Wikipedia